Paracapnia opis, the northeastern snowfly, is a species of small winter stonefly in the family Capniidae. It is found in North America. Described by Edward Newman in 1839, it was the first known insect in the genus Paracapnia. It is synonymous with Paracapnia curvata (Hanson, 1946).

References

 DeWalt R, Cao Y, Tweddale T, Grubbs S, Hinz L, Pessino M, Robinson J (2012). "Ohio USA stoneflies (Insecta, Plecoptera): species richness estimation, distribution of functional niche traits, drainage affiliations, and relationships to other states". ZooKeys 178: 1-26.

Further reading

 

Plecoptera
Taxa named by Edward Newman